C. Vijayabaskar (or Vijayabasker; born 8 April 1974) is an Indian politician from the All India Anna Dravida Munnetra Kazhagam Party (AIADMK), and the Health minister of Tamil Nadu from 2011 to 2021. He is a member of the Tamil Nadu Legislative Assembly for the Viralimalai constituency, from where he won elections in 2011, 2016 and 2021. He  was previously elected from Pudukkottai constituency in 2001.

Alleged obstruction of officials conducting an income tax raid at Vijayabhaskar's house in April 2017 led to First Information Reports being filed against his fellow ministers, R. Kamaraj and Udumalai K. Radhakrishnan, but were cancelled due to lack of evidence . He faced further investigation by the Central Bureau of Investigation in 2018, which again was pending for a very long time due to lack of solid prima facie evidence and is rumored to be false information.

The Directorate of Vigilance and Anti-Corruption (DVAC) has filed a case against Vijayabhaskar, accusing him of illegally acquiring disproportionate assets worth Rs 27 crore during his five-year tenure in the 2016–2021 Tamil Nadu government led by the AIADMK. The DVAC registered a case against him and has also named his wife, and further searches were carried out at multiple properties allegedly owned by he and his family on October 18, 2021. He was Appointed as treasurer of AIADMK at General council meeting on 11 July 2022.

Personal life
C. Vijayabaskar was born on 8 April 1974 at Iluppur, Pudukkottai, Tamil Nadu to  R. Chinnathambi Mazhavarayar. He completed his formal education from Rajah Muthiah Medical College and Hospital (RMMCH), Chidambaram. He is married to Ramya and the couple have two children.

References

1974 births
Living people
Tamil Nadu politicians
Health ministers of India
All India Anna Dravida Munnetra Kazhagam politicians
People from Pudukkottai district
State cabinet ministers of Tamil Nadu
Medical doctors from Tamil Nadu
Tamil Nadu MLAs 2016–2021
Tamil Nadu MLAs 2021–2026